San Juan is a district of the Naranjo canton, in the Alajuela province of Costa Rica.

History 
San Juan was created on 31 March 1966 by Decreto Ejecutivo 11. Segregated from Naranjo.

Geography 
San Juan has an area of  km² and an elevation of  metres.

Demographics 

For the 2011 census, San Juan had a population of  inhabitants.

Transportation

Road transportation 
The district is covered by the following road routes:
 National Route 141
 National Route 148
 National Route 725
 National Route 726

References 

Districts of Alajuela Province
Populated places in Alajuela Province